Mandaree School District No. 36 is a school district headquartered in Mandaree, North Dakota. It is on the Fort Berthold Indian Reservation.

It is in McKenzie and Dunn counties. It is also affiliated with the Bureau of Indian Education (BIE). It is also known as Mandaree Day School.

History
In the 1970s the principal, Robert Schumacher, started a radio station called KRSS.

In 1995 the school had 256 students.

In 2004 the Bureau of Indian Affairs (BIA), the parent agency of what became the BIE, investigated the special education program after parents made complaints.

In April 2020, Kirsten Baesler, the state superintendent of education, approved the school having a four-day week instead of a five day.

Culture
The homecoming celebration uses Hidatsa traditions and, as of 1995, promotes abstaining from drugs and alcohol.

References

External links
 Mandaree School District

School districts in North Dakota
Education in McKenzie County, North Dakota
Dunn County, North Dakota